Sarabian (also Romanized as Sarābīān; also known as Sarākīān and Sarākīān) is a village in Dowlatabad Rural District, in the Central District of Ravansar County, Kermanshah Province, Iran. At the 2006 census, its population was 114, in 21 families.

References 

Populated places in Ravansar County